Tonga, Cameroon is a town and commune in Cameroon.

Geography
The Tonga sub-division has three major village groups: Badoumga (Banounga), Baloua and Babitchoua.

Economy
The population is 98% subsistence farmers producing food crops and cash crops like cocoa and coffee in small farms.

Health
On the health front, the Tonga sub-division has 3 health facilities:
Tonga Health and Social Welfare Center 
Tonga Catholic Health Center
Maham Health Center

Climate
The climate is equatorial, characterized by the alternation of two dry seasons and two rainy seasons.

See also
Communes of Cameroon

References

 Site de la primature - Élections municipales 2002 
 Contrôle de gestion et performance des services publics communaux des villes camerounaises - Thèse de Donation Avele, Université Montesquieu Bordeaux IV 
 Charles Nanga, La réforme de l’administration territoriale au Cameroun à la lumière de la loi constitutionnelle n° 96/06 du 18 janvier 1996, Mémoire ENA. 

Populated places in West Region (Cameroon)
Communes of Cameroon